In several countries, the Marshal of Nobility was an elected representative of the nobility to perform certain functions. The term may refer to:
 Marshal of Nobility (Russia) (Предводитель дворянства)
 Marshal of Nobility (Poland) (Marszałek szlachty)
 Marshal of Nobility (Estonia) (Aadlimarssal)